The discography of German singer Herbert Grönemeyer counts 15 studio albums, five live albums, as well as two compilations, six video albums and 40 singles. According to Bundesverband Musikindustrie, Grönemeyer is the best-selling artist in Germany, with over 18 million records sold. IFPI Austria lists sales of more than one million records, while the singer sold more than 650,000 records in Switzerland, according to IFPI Switzerland.

Albums

Studio albums

German language studio albums

English language studio albums

Soundtrack albums 
 2010: The American
 2014: A Most Wanted Man

Live albums

Remix-albums

Compilation albums

Box sets

Singles

Singles

Collaboration singles

Other collaborations 
 1985 "Nackt im Wind" (Single) by Band for Africa (with Nena, Udo Lindenberg, Peter Maffay, Rio Reiser, Wolfgang Niedecken and others)
 1991 The Fall of the House of Usher as The Herbalist (album by Peter Hammill and Judge Smith)
 1996 "Uebers Meer" (Album: Tribute to Rio Reiser)
 2003 "Taxi Europa" (Album: Taxi Europa) by Stephan Eicher
 2004 "Everlasting" (Album: Unity – Athens 2004) with Youssou N'Dour
 2005 "Einmal nur in unserem Leben" (Album: Dreimal Zehn Jahre BAP) by BAP
 2006 "Grauschleier" (Album: 26½) by Fehlfarben
 2006 "Zeit, dass sich was dreht / Celebrate the day / Fetez cette journée" (Single) with Amadou and Marjam
 2006 "Geld 2006 (Internet Warm-Up Version)" song released as a bonus track on rarities compilation "Mon Amour" by Klaus Dinger
 2007 "Einfach sein" (Album: Fornika) by Die Fantastischen Vier
 2008 "Will I Ever Learn" (Album: Was muss muss) with Antony Hegarty
 2009 "Mes Emmerdes" (Album: Duos) with Charles Aznavour
 2009 "Als es mir beschissen ging" (Album: Duos) with Charles Aznavour
 2015 ″Staubkorn (The Dying Rays)″ (Album: What Happens Next) with Gang Of Four

Videos

Video albums

References 

Discographies of German artists